The Elm Tree Plat Historic District encompasses an early 20th-century neighborhood of East Providence, Rhode Island.  Developed beginning in 1924, it contains 53 single-family residences and one commercial building, most of which were built between 1925 and 1935 as a streetcar suburb development serving the Providence area.  Most of the houses were built by a single pair of developers, Severin Carlson and Carl Johnson, and are one and two-story Bungalow-style houses.  It is roughly bounded by Willett, Harvey, and Fenner Avenues and Charlotte Street, in southern East Providence.

The district was listed on the National Register of Historic Places in 2015.

See also
National Register of Historic Places listings in Providence County, Rhode Island

References

Historic districts in Providence County, Rhode Island
East Providence, Rhode Island
Historic districts on the National Register of Historic Places in Rhode Island
National Register of Historic Places in Providence County, Rhode Island